The Benjamin Boorman House is a historic 19th century residence located at 211 North Union Street in Mauston, Wisconsin. It was added to the National Register of Historic Places on May 4, 1976.

Description and history
The house was built by English immigrant Benjamin Boorman for himself and his first wife Elizabeth Boorman. After her death in 1874, Benjamin Boorman remarried the following year on July 19, 1875, marrying Margaret A. Hall. Two children were born: George dying in infancy; and Rob Roy. Margaret was a sister of Benjamin's brother Clarence Boorman's wife.

After Benjamin Boorman's death, the house was owned by Jeff T. Heath, Tom Powers, John Tremain, and Francis Gardner.

Juneau County Historical Society museum
The Juneau County Historical Society was formed at the house in 1963. In 1987, the society purchased the house from Edward W. Pierce and transformed it into a historic house museum.

References

External links

 Juneau County Historical Society
 Juneau County Historical Society Museum-Boorman House - Wisconsin Historical Society
 wcwcw.com: The Benjamin Boorman House Museum — article + visiting information.

Houses in Juneau County, Wisconsin
Historic house museums in Wisconsin
Historical society museums in Wisconsin
Museums in Juneau County, Wisconsin
Houses on the National Register of Historic Places in Wisconsin
National Register of Historic Places in Juneau County, Wisconsin
Houses completed in 1877
1877 establishments in Wisconsin